Josef Čapek  (23 March 1887 – April 1945) was a Czech artist who was best known as a painter, but who was also noted as a writer and a poet. He invented the word "robot", which was introduced into literature by his brother, Karel Čapek.

Life

Čapek was born in Hronov, Bohemia (Austria-Hungary, later Czechoslovakia, now the Czech Republic) in 1887. First a painter of the Cubist school, he later developed his own playful, minimalist style. He collaborated with his brother Karel on a number of plays and short stories; on his own, he wrote the utopian play Land of Many Names and several novels, as well as critical essays in which he argued for the art of the unconscious, of children, and of 'savages'. He was named by his brother as the true inventor of the term robot. As a cartoonist, he worked for Lidové Noviny, a newspaper based in Prague.
Due to his critical attitude towards national socialism and Adolf Hitler, he was arrested after the German invasion of Czechoslovakia in 1939. He wrote Poems from a Concentration Camp in the Bergen-Belsen concentration camp, where he died in 1945. In June 1945 Rudolf Margolius, accompanied by Čapek's wife Jarmila Čapková, went to Bergen-Belsen to search for him. His remains were never found. In 1948 the court officially set the date of his death as 30 April 1947.

His illustrated stories Povídání o Pejskovi a Kočičce (English translation as The Adventures of Puss and Pup) are considered classics of Czech children's literature.

Selected literary works 
Lelio, 1917
Ze života hmyzu (Pictures from the Insects' Life), 1921 – with Karel Čapek
Povídání o pejskovi a kočičce (The Adventures of Puss and Pup), 1929
Stín kapradiny, 1930, novel
Kulhavý poutník, essays, 1936
Land of Many Names
Básně z koncentračního tabora (Poems from a Concentration Camp), published posthumously 1946
Adam Stvořitel (Adam the Creator) – with Karel Čapek
Dášeňka, čili život štěněte (Dashenka, consequently the life of a Puppy) – with Karel Čapek, illustrated by Josef

Gallery

See also
 Brothers Čapek
 Karel Čapek

Literature
 Ivan Margolius, 'The Robot of Prague',  Newsletter, The Friends of Czech Heritage  no. 17, Autumn 2017, pp. 3 – 6.  https://czechfriends.net/images/RobotsMargoliusJul2017.pdf
 Marie Šulcová. Čapci, Ladění pro dvě struny, Poločas nadějí, Brána věčnosti, Praha: Melantrich 1993-98
 Marie Šulcová. Prodloužený čas Josefa Čapka, Praha: Paseka 2000

References

External links 

 
 
 Bratří Čapkové (The Brothers Čapek) at LC Authorities, with 6 records

1887 births
1945 deaths
Cubist artists
Czech people who died in Bergen-Belsen concentration camp
20th-century Czech painters
Czech male painters
Czech male writers
Czech scenic designers
People from Hronov
Recipients of the Order of Tomáš Garrigue Masaryk
Writers who illustrated their own writing
History of robotics
20th-century Czech male artists